John George Mackie (born 5 July 1976) is an English former professional footballer who played as a central defender, notably for Reading and Leyton Orient. He was most recently joint manager of FC Romania.

Playing career
Mackie was born in London and played football both for his school and for the Area London School Boys team. His dream was to play for Arsenal with whom he had a try out, but was unsuccessful. Later he gained an apprenticeship at West Ham United. At the end of his two-year apprenticeship Mackie was released by West Ham and he started work on a fruit and veg stall while playing for a pub team and Kingsbury Town. He joined Crawley Town in 1995, playing in the Southern League Premier Division. In 1999 he was signed by, then Reading manager, Alan Pardew and joined the then Second Division club. Pardew immediately loaned Mackie out to Sutton United to gain more experience before he start playing for Reading on a semi-regular basis. In his time at Reading Mackie got to play against Chelsea in a League Cup game where the opposition strike force that night consisted of Hernan Crespo.

Mackie's time came to an end at Reading in January 2004 when he signed for Leyton Orient.

In the 2005–06 season, Mackie made a formidable partnership for Leyton Orient with Gabriel Zakuani and went down in Orient folklore by captaining the Os to their first automatic promotion in 36 years. He was released by the club at the end of the 2006–07 season.

On 16 May 2007, he signed for Brentford on a two-year contract. Two days after signing for the Bees, it was announced that Mackie would be Brentford captain for the 2007–08 season. However, Mackie only made 14 league appearances for the club before leaving by mutual consent. He signed for A.F.C. Hornchurch on 18 January 2008, he has since retired from the game and now runs a greengrocers on Blackstock Road in North London. On 7 August 2008, Mackie signed for Hertford Town in a semi-professional capacity, but did not make an appearance.

Coaching career
Mackie was appointed assistant manager of Greenwich Borough in December 2015.

Mackie was appointed assistant manager of Potters Bar Town in May 2019.

In April 2021, Mackie was appointed joint-manager of Essex Senior League club Walthamstow with Terry Spillane. The 2021–22 season saw the management duo lead Walthamstow to the Essex Senior League title, their first league title in 37 years. On 15 September 2022, Mackie and Spillane were sacked by the club.

On 29 September 2022, Mackie was appointed joint manager of FC Romania, again with Terry Spillane. Mackie left the club on 31 October 2022.

Career statistics

Honours 
Reading

 Football League Second Division second-place promotion: 2001–02

Leyton Orient

 Football League Two third-place promotion: 2005–06

References

External links

John Mackie at readingfc.co.uk

1976 births
Living people
English footballers
Association football defenders
Reading F.C. players
Leyton Orient F.C. players
Brentford F.C. players
Hornchurch F.C. players
Hertford Town F.C. players
Crawley Town F.C. players
Sutton United F.C. players
London Tigers F.C. players
Southern Football League players
English Football League players
Isthmian League players
Footballers from Whitechapel
English football managers
Southern Football League managers
Waltham Forest F.C. managers
F.C. Romania managers